Elden Racing Cars was a British motor sport company involved in designing (under the brand of Design Formula), building and racing cars. Most frequently associated with Formula Ford in the 1970s, the marque also produced Formula Atlantic, Formula 3, Formula 4, Formula Ford 2000 and Formula Renault vehicles (among others). In total Elden produced more than 38 individual designs from birth to the present day.  

The company was founded in 1967 by John Thompson and brothers Peter Hampsheir and Brian Hampsheir.

Racing cars

External links
Elden Racing website
Photos and specifications of all Elden models
Company history

References

1961 establishments in England
British racecar constructors
Vehicle manufacturing companies established in 1961
British companies established in 1961